In My Mother's House is a 1941 picture book by Ann Nolan Clark and illustrated by Velino Herrera. A Tewa character presents his life. The book was a recipient of a 1942 Caldecott Honor for its illustrations.

References

1941 children's books
American picture books
Caldecott Honor-winning works